Sadeqabad (also Romanized as Şādeqābād) is a village in Sagezabad Rural District, in the Central District of Buin Zahra County, Qazvin Province, Iran. At the 2006 census, its population was 58, in 14 families.

References 

Populated places in Buin Zahra County